César Pablo Rigamonti (born 7 April 1987) is an Argentine professional footballer who plays as a goalkeeper for Central Córdoba SdE.

Career
Rigamonti made his professional debut on 26 September 2009 in a Primera B Nacional game with Instituto, he was subbed on for the final eight minutes after Juan Carlos Olave received a red card. He got his first start in the following match, a 2–2 draw with Defensa y Justicia. Ten further appearances followed between October 2009 and June 2013, prior to Rigamonti leaving Belgrano, now of the Argentine Primera División, on a temporary basis to join Sportivo Belgrano. He went onto play forty-one times for the club in Primera B Nacional.

In July 2014, Rigamonti agreed to sign for Banfield on loan. He failed to make an appearance throughout the 2014 campaign, but was on the bench for thirteen fixtures in all competitions. After zero appearances for Banfield, Rigamonti joined Sarmiento on loan shortly after arriving back with Belgrano. His debut for Sarmiento came on 15 February 2015 in a 1–4 defeat at home to River Plate. In total, Rigamonti made thirty appearances as Sarmiento finished 24th. He returned to Belgrano for the 2016 season but didn't make an appearance.

Ahead of the 2016–17 Argentine Primera División season, Rigamonti made a loan move to Quilmes. He went onto play in all thirty of Quilmes' league fixtures, in a campaign that ended in relegation to Primera B Nacional. On 3 August 2017, Rigamonti was loaned out for the fifth time as he joined Vélez Sarsfield.

In July 2022, Rigamonti joined Central Córdoba SdE. After a hard collision in a league game against Arsenal de Sarandí on 30 November 2021, Rigamonte suffered three fractured ribs and two cracked ribs.

Career statistics
.

References

External links

1987 births
Living people
Sportspeople from Córdoba Province, Argentina
Argentine people of Italian descent
Argentine footballers
Association football goalkeepers
Primera Nacional players
Argentine Primera División players
Club Atlético Belgrano footballers
Sportivo Belgrano footballers
Club Atlético Banfield footballers
Club Atlético Sarmiento footballers
Quilmes Atlético Club footballers
Club Atlético Vélez Sarsfield footballers
Central Córdoba de Santiago del Estero footballers
Club Deportivo Palestino footballers
Chilean Primera División players
Expatriate footballers in Chile